Sidra or Sidr is a port about 23 km west of Ra's Lanuf in Libya. Sidra Airport is directly next to the port.

History
This oil port increased in importance as Libya's economy developed in the last quarter of the 20th century.

Libyan Civil War
During the Libyan Civil War, forces under the leadership of the National Transitional Council captured the port of Sidra at the beginning of March 2011. Pro-Gaddafi forces tried to retake the port from the anti-Gaddafi forces some days later.

Second Libyan Civil War
During the Second Libyan Civil War, the Islamic State of Iraq and the Levant's Libyan branch launched an attempt to seize the port in January 2016. At least one oil storage tank was set ablaze by a long-range rocket.

In June 2018, militiamen led by Ibrahim Jadhran seized the port from the Libyan National Army. The LNA recaptured the port on 21 June.  

In January 2020, the National Oil Corporation declared force majuere over oil loadings at the port after a blockade was imposed by tribes affiliated with the Libyan National Army of Khalifa Haftar. 

In July 2020, the National Oil Corporation reported that Wagner Group, Janjaweed and Syrian mercenaries were present at the port.

External links
 Location of vessels in the port of Sidra

References

Port cities and towns in Libya
Populated places in Sirte District
Gulf of Sidra
Populated coastal places in Libya
Tripolitania
Ports and harbors of Libya